Devagiri-M-Kyarakoppa is a village in Dharwad district of Karnataka, India.

Demographics
As of the 2011 Census of India there were 139 households in Devagiri-M-Kyarkoppa and a total population of 767 consisting of 393 males and 374 females. There were 116 children ages 0-6.

References

2. Village Directory, 2011 census of India

Villages in Dharwad district